Lady Susan is an epistolary novella by Jane Austen, possibly written in 1794 but not published until 1871. This early complete work, which the author never submitted for publication, describes the schemes of the title character.

Synopsis
Lady Susan Vernon, a beautiful and charming recent widow, visits her brother-in-law (late husband's brother) and his wife, Charles and Catherine Vernon, with little advance notice at Churchill, their country residence. Catherine is far from pleased, as Lady Susan had tried to prevent her marriage to Charles and her unwanted guest has been described to her as "the most accomplished coquette in England". Among Lady Susan's conquests is the married Mr. Manwaring.

Catherine's brother Reginald arrives a week later, and despite Catherine's strong warnings about Lady Susan's character, soon falls under her spell. Lady Susan toys with the younger man's affections for her own amusement and later because she perceives it makes her sister-in-law uneasy. Her confidante, Mrs. Johnson, to whom she writes frequently, recommends she marry the very eligible Reginald, but Lady Susan considers him to be greatly inferior to Manwaring.

Frederica, Lady Susan's 16-year-old daughter, tries to run away from school when she learns of her mother's plan to marry her off to a wealthy but insipid young man she loathes. She also becomes a guest at Churchill. Catherine comes to like her—her character is totally unlike her mother's—and as time goes by, detects Frederica's growing attachment to the oblivious Reginald.

Later, Sir James Martin, Frederica's unwanted suitor, shows up uninvited, much to her distress and her mother's vexation. When Frederica begs Reginald for support out of desperation (having been forbidden by Lady Susan to turn to Charles and Catherine), this causes a temporary breach between Reginald and Lady Susan, but the latter soon repairs the rupture.

Lady Susan decides to return to London and marry her daughter off to Sir James. Reginald follows, still bewitched by her charms and intent on marrying her, but he encounters Mrs. Manwaring at the home of Mr. Johnson and finally learns Lady Susan's true character. Lady Susan ends up marrying Sir James herself, and allows Frederica to reside with Charles and Catherine at Churchill, where Reginald De Courcy "could be talked, flattered, and finessed into an affection for her."

Main characters

Lady Susan Vernon
The main character is aged about 35 or 36 years old (middle-aged for the time). She is the daughter of an earl. She is a widow of just a few months, who is known to flagrantly manipulate and seduce single and married men alike. As she has been left in a financially precarious state due to the death of her first husband, she uses flirtation and seduction to gain her objectives and maintain a semblance of her former opulent lifestyle. As a widow and a mother, her main goals are to quickly marry off her daughter Frederica (of whom she is contemptuous, regarding her as stupid and stubborn) to a wealthy man, and to marry an even better match herself. Mrs. Vernon describes her as: ...really excessively pretty.... I have seldom seen so lovely a woman as Lady Susan. She is delicately fair, with fine grey eyes and dark eyelashes; and from her appearance one would not suppose her more than five and twenty, though she must in fact be ten years older. I was certainly not disposed to admire her... but I cannot help feeling that she possesses an uncommon union of symmetry, brilliancy and grace. Lady Susan is cold towards her daughter, for whom she feels little or no affection: she calls her "a stupid girl" who "has nothing to recommend her." It is possible that Jane Austen drew on the character of the mother of her neighbour, a beautiful Mrs. Craven, who had actually treated her daughters quite cruelly, locking them up, beating and starving them, till they ran away from home or married beneath their class to escape. There is an ironic contrast between the beautiful but determinedly chaste Susannah of the Bible and Lady Susan.
Frederica Vernon
Daughter of Lady Susan. Oppressed by her mother, Frederica is very shy and it is only over time that the reader can perceive that rather than being stupid and stubborn, she is a sweet, sensible girl whose kind nature continually is at odds with Lady Susan's venal selfishness. Frederica is not as beautiful as her mother, but has a mild, delicate prettiness which, together with her evident ability to feel gratitude, endears her to the Vernons.
Catherine Vernon
Sister-in-law to Lady Susan. Lady Susan easily perceives how much Mrs. Vernon dislikes her, but allows that she is "well bred" and has the air of "a woman of fashion." She feels far more affection and concern for Frederica than Lady Susan does, and often laments Lady Susan's great neglect of her daughter.
Charles Vernon
Brother-in-law to Lady Susan. An amenable man who allows her to stay at his home.
Reginald De Courcy
Brother of Mrs. Vernon. He is handsome, kind, warm, and open, but rather gullible. Mrs. Vernon writes in a letter to their mother, "Oh! Reginald, how is your judgment enslaved!"
Lady De Courcy
Confidante and mother of Mrs. Vernon. Lady De Courcy trusts her daughter's judgement and is concerned that Reginald not be taken in by Lady Susan.
Alicia Johnson
The intimate friend to whom Lady Susan confides all her true scheming. Mrs. Johnson has an immoral mindset similar to that of her friend. Stuck in a marriage with a sensible man whom she does not love, whom Lady Susan derisively describes as "just old enough to be formal, ungovernable and to have the gout – too old to be agreeable, and too young to die", she delights in hearing of and making suggestions for Lady Susan's manipulative plans.

Analysis

Although the theme, together with the focus on character study and moral issues, is close to Austen's published work (Sense and Sensibility was also originally written in the epistolary form), its outlook is very different, and Lady Susan has few parallels in 19th-century literature. Susan is a selfish, unscrupulous and scheming woman, highly attractive to men, who is unashamed of her relationship with a married man. Lady Susan subverts all the standards of the romantic novel: she has an active role, she is not only beautiful but intelligent and witty, and her suitors are significantly younger than she is (in contrast to Sense and Sensibility and Emma, which feature marriages by their female protagonists to men who are 16 years older). Although the ending includes a traditional reward for morality, Lady Susan herself is treated more leniently than the adulteress, Maria Bertram, in Mansfield Park, who is severely punished.

Film and television adaptations
As of 2009, Lady Susan was being adapted by British writer Lucy Prebble for Celador Films and BBC4.

Whit Stillman's  adaptation of Lady Susan, retitled Love & Friendship after Austen's juvenile work of that name, was included in the Sundance Film Festival in January 2016. The US release date was May 13, 2016. The film  stars Kate Beckinsale, Chloe Sevigny, Xavier Samuel and Stephen Fry. It received strongly positive reviews.

Stage and book adaptations
The stage adaptation Lady Susan: Jane Austen's Distinguished Flirt by Bonnie Milne Gardner was performed at Ohio Wesleyan University in 1998 and is published by Scripts for Stage.

A two-woman version of Lady Susan, adapted by Inis Theatre, played at the Dublin fringe festival in 2001–2.

An adaptation by Christine U'Ren was performed by Bella Union Theatre Company at the Berkeley City Club in Berkeley, California, in July 2009.

Lady Susan (a novel), a 1980 complete re-write by Phyllis Ann Karr.

Lady Vernon and Her Daughter, a novel-length reconstruction of Lady Susan, was published by Crown Publishing in 2009. Written by mother-and-daughter co-authors Jane Rubino and Caitlen Rubino-Bradway, the adaptation reinterprets the work to conform closely to Austen's more mature prose style.

A further adaptation of the text, in the form of a novelization by director Whit Stillman, was announced for publication to coincide with the general release of the film (under the same title) on 13 May 2016, starring Kate Beckinsale. Alexandra Alter of The New York Times states in her 2016 interview article with Stillman, describing the novelization: "In the novel, Mr. Stillman takes the characters and plot from Austen's fictionalized letters and narrates the tale from the perspective of Lady Susan's nephew, who hopes to counter criticism of his maligned aunt. The 41 letters from Austen's Lady Susan are included in an appendix." Stillman told Alter that he felt Lady Susan was not quite finished and thought the form of the book was "so flawed". After realising that there was another story to be told, he convinced the publisher Little, Brown and Company to let him write the novel.

In November 2020, Jane Austen's Lady Susan (a play) by Rob Urbinati was published by Samuel French. and its world premier performance was produced October 2021 by the Good Theater at the St. Lawrence Arts Center in Portland, Maine.

References

Further reading

External links

 Austen, Jane. "Lady Susan", Richard Bentley and Son, 1871, pp 203–291. Literature in Context: An Open Anthology.
 
 
 
 Jane Austen Information Page
 Jane Austen Centre, Bath, England
 Lady Susan: Jane Austen's Distinguished Flirt by Bonnie Milne Gardner

Novels by Jane Austen
1794 British novels
18th-century British novels
1871 British novels
Epistolary novels
British novels adapted into films
British novels adapted into plays
Novels about nobility
Novels published posthumously
Works about widowhood